Fuglehuken is a headland at the northern end of Prins Karls Forland, Svalbard. The headland includes the mountain Fuglehukfjellet (583 meters). A radio beacon was installed at Fuglehuken in 1946.

References

Headlands of Svalbard
Prins Karls Forland